Hoyt Sanford Vandenberg (January 24, 1899 – April 2, 1954) was a United States Air Force general. He served as the second Chief of Staff of the Air Force, and the second Director of Central Intelligence.

During World War II, Vandenberg was the commanding general of the Ninth Air Force, a tactical air force in England and in France, supporting the Army, from August 1944 until V-E Day. Vandenberg Space Force Base on the central coast of California is named after him. In 1946, he was briefly the U.S. Chief of Military Intelligence. He was the nephew of Arthur H. Vandenberg, a former U.S. Senator from Michigan.

Early life
Vandenberg was born in Milwaukee, Wisconsin, the son of Pearl Kane and William Collins Vandenbergh, both from Dutch ancestry. He grew up in Lowell, Massachusetts, spending his teenage years there. While there he was one of the first Eagle Scouts in the Boy Scouts of America's Lowell Council. He graduated from the United States Military Academy on June 12, 1923, and was commissioned a second lieutenant in the United States Army Air Service.

Military career

Vandenberg graduated from the Air Service Flying School at Brooks Field, Texas, in February 1924, and from the Air Service Advanced Flying School at Kelly Field, Texas, in September 1924.

Vandenberg's first assignment was with the 90th Attack Squadron, part of the 3d Attack Group at Kelly Field. (In 1926 Lt. Van was also a stunt pilot for the silent film "Wings" which was filming in San Antonio.  "Wings" won the first Academy Award for a motion picture.) Vandenberg was appointed commander of the 90th AS on January 1, 1926. In 1927, he became an instructor at the Air Corps Primary Flying School at March Field, Calif. In 1928 he was promoted to first lieutenant. In May 1929 he went to Wheeler Field, Hawaii, to join the 6th Pursuit Squadron, and assumed command of it the following November.

Returning in September 1931, Vandenberg was appointed a flying instructor at Randolph Field, Texas, and became a flight commander and deputy stage commander there in March 1933. He entered the Air Corps Tactical School at Maxwell Field, Alabama, in August 1934, and graduated the following June. Two months later he enrolled in the Command and General Staff School at Fort Leavenworth, Kansas; he completed the course in June 1936 and was promoted to the rank of captain. He then became an instructor in the Pursuit Section of the Air Corps Tactical School, where he taught until September 1936, when he entered the Army War College, where he specialized in air defense planning for the Philippines.

After graduating from the War College in June 1939, Vandenberg was assigned to the Plans Division in the Office of the Chief of Air Corps, selected personally by its head, Brigadier General Carl Spaatz, whom he had met at the Command and General Staff College. In September 1939 and the autumn of 1940, Vandenberg developed two air plans for the Philippine Department, the second based on Royal Air Force interceptor operations in the Battle of Britain, but neither was adopted by the War Department when the Roosevelt Administration reaffirmed its long-standing opposition to any plan that called for extensive reinforcement of the defenses in the Philippines. In 1940 Vandenberg was promoted to major and in 1941 to lieutenant colonel.

A few months after the United States entered World War II, Vandenberg was promoted to colonel and became operations and training officer of the Air Staff. For his services in these two positions he received the Distinguished Service Medal.

In June 1942, Vandenberg was assigned to the United Kingdom and assisted in the organization of the Air Forces in North Africa. While in Great Britain he was appointed the chief of staff of the Twelfth Air Force, which he helped organize. In December 1942 Vandenberg earned the promotion to brigadier general. On February 18, 1943, Vandenberg became the chief of staff of the Northwest African Strategic Air Force (NASAF), which was under the command of Major General James Doolittle. NASAF was the strategic arm of the new Northwest African Air Forces (NAAF) under Lieutenant General Carl Spaatz. With NASAF, Vandenberg flew on numerous missions over Tunisia, Pantelleria, Sardinia, Sicily, and Italy. He was awarded both the Silver Star and the Distinguished Flying Cross for his services during this time. For his organizational ability with the Twelfth Air Force and his work as chief of staff of the NASAF, he was awarded the Legion of Merit. In August 1943, Vandenberg was assigned to Air Force headquarters as Deputy Chief of Air Staff. In September 1943, he became head of an air mission to Russia, under Ambassador Harriman, and returned to the United States in January 1944. In March 1944, he earned the promotion to major general and then he was transferred to the European theater; in April 1944, he was designated the Deputy Air Commander in Chief of the Allied Expeditionary Forces and the Commander of its American Air Component.

In August 1944, Vandenberg assumed command of the Ninth Air Force. On November 28, 1944, he received an oak leaf cluster to his Distinguished Service Medal for his part in planning the Normandy invasion. He was promoted to lieutenant general in March 1945.

Vandenberg was appointed the Assistant Chief of Air Staff at the U.S. Army Air Forces (USAAF) headquarters in July 1945. In January 1946, he became Director of Intelligence on the War Department general staff where he served until his appointment in June 1946, as Director of Central Intelligence, a position he held until May 1947.

Vandenberg returned to duty with the Air Force in April 1947, and on June 15 became the Deputy Commander in Chief of the Air Staff. Following the division of the United States Department of War into the Departments of the Army and the Air Force, Vandenberg was designated the Vice Chief of Staff of the United States Air Force on October 1, 1947, and promoted to the rank of general.

Even when Vandenberg was at the pinnacle of his military career, his boyish good looks and outgoing personality often made him the target of attacks on his credibility and experience. However, the attention that his appearance brought on was not all bad. He appeared on the covers of Time and Life magazines. The Washington Post once described him as "the most impossibly handsome man on the entire Washington scene," and Marilyn Monroe once named Vandenberg, along with Joe DiMaggio and Albert Einstein, as one of the three people with whom she would want to be stranded on a deserted island.

On April 30, 1948, Vandenberg became the Chief of Staff of the United States Air Force, succeeding General Carl Spaatz. He was renominated by President Harry S. Truman for a second term as Air Force Chief of Staff on March 6, 1952. The nomination was confirmed on April 28, with Vandenberg serving until June 30, 1953.

A controversy arose while Vandenberg was the Air Force Chief of Staff, when he opposed the United States Secretary of Defense Charles Erwin Wilson on a proposed $5 billion budget reduction for the Air Force. Vandenberg maintained that the cut backed by Wilson would reduce military aviation to a "one-shot Air Force," inferior to that of the Soviet Union. He said it was another instance of "start-stop" planning of a kind that had impeded Air Force development in previous years. The cut in appropriations went into effect in July 1953, immediately after his retirement from the Air Force.

Later life

A scratch golfer, he spent much time on golf courses. He was also a lover of movies, Westerns, and scotch. Vandenberg retired from active duty on June 30, 1953, and he died nine months later, at the Walter Reed Army Medical Center of prostate cancer at the age of 55. He is interred in Section 30 of Arlington National Cemetery.

His wife, Gladys Merritt (Rose) Vandenberg (1898–1978), started the concept of the Arlington Ladies while he was Air Force Chief of Staff. The program provides that a military lady of the appropriate service represents the service chief at all military funerals at Arlington National Cemetery. She was buried, alongside her husband, in Arlington National Cemetery upon her death on January 9, 1978. They are survived by their children, Gloria Vandenberg Miller and Hoyt S. Vandenberg, Jr.

Namesakes
On October 4, 1958, the missile and space base at Camp Cooke in Lompoc, California, was renamed Vandenberg Air Force Base (which was redesignated Vandenberg Space Force Base in 2021). In July 1963, the instrument ship  was renamed at Cape Canaveral, Florida, for duty on the Eastern Space and Missile Range in the Atlantic. One of the two cadets' dormitories at the United States Air Force Academy, Vandenberg Hall, is also named in his honor. In addition, a popular enlisted "hangout" for technical school Airmen at Keesler AFB, Mississippi, is named in his honor, as was the Vandenberg Esplanade, along the Merrimack River in Lowell, Massachusetts and part of the Lowell Heritage State Park.

Dates of rank

Sources:

Awards and decorations
  Command Pilot

Foreign awards

The Manuscript Collection of Hoyt S. Vandenberg at the Library of Congress as of November 2005 is Classified information.

References

External links

 Biography by the United States Air Force
 National Aviation – Hoyt Vandenberg
 
 General Vandenberg on the cover of Life magazine, December 5 1949

|-

|-

1899 births
1954 deaths
Air Corps Tactical School alumni
American people of Dutch descent
Burials at Arlington National Cemetery
Chiefs of Staff of the United States Air Force
Commanders with Star of the Order of Polonia Restituta
Deaths from prostate cancer
Directors of the Central Intelligence Agency
Grand Officers of the Order of Orange-Nassau
Honorary Knights Commander of the Order of the Bath
Joint Chiefs of Staff
Knights Grand Cross of the Military Order of Savoy
Recipients of the Legion of Honour
People from Lowell, Massachusetts
Military personnel from Milwaukee
Recipients of the Air Medal
Recipients of the Croix de guerre (Belgium)
Recipients of the Croix de Guerre (France)
Recipients of the Distinguished Flying Cross (United States)
Recipients of the Distinguished Service Medal (US Army)
Recipients of the Legion of Merit
Recipients of the Order of Aviz
Recipients of the Order of the Sacred Tripod
Recipients of the Silver Star
United States Air Force generals
United States Army Command and General Staff College alumni
United States Military Academy alumni
Vice Chiefs of Staff of the United States Air Force
Military personnel from Massachusetts